The Kankakee County Soldiers was a semi-professional basketball team of the Independent Basketball Association (IBA).

For their first five seasons (2007-11), the Soldiers played in the International Basketball League (IBL). In October 2011 team president Barry Bradford formed the Independent Basketball Association. The Soldiers were one of six charter members of the IBA.

History 
Formed in 2007 as the Chicago Heights Soldiers, the club became the Windy City Soldiers in 2008. For the 2009 season it was announced that the team name would change from Windy City Soldiers to Kankakee County Soldiers.

Kankakee County played six seasons in the IBL, winning the 2010 Winter season.

The Soldiers were winners of the first five IBA championships. That streak ended in June 2014 when Grand Rapids Fusion captured the IBA Spring season title.

Season by season

All-Stars

2007 IBL
 Barry Bradford
 Amir Major

References

External links
Official website

Independent Basketball Association teams
Basketball teams in Chicago
Basketball teams established in 2007
2007 establishments in Illinois
Kankakee, Illinois